Aspid is the trading name of IFR Automotive, S.L., a Spanish automobile manufacturer. The company was founded in by 2003 by Ignacio Fernández Rodríguez.

The name of the company comes from the viper species (Vipera aspis) found in northern Spain—where the company is based.

See also
 IFR Aspid
 Aspid GT-21 Invictus

External links
 Official website

Car manufacturers of Spain
Companies based in Catalonia
2003 establishments in Spain